Jeffrey Brown (born July 1975) is an American cartoonist born in Grand Rapids, Michigan.

Biography

Early life and education

After growing up in Grand Rapids, Michigan, Brown moved to Chicago in 2000 to pursue an MFA at the School of the Art Institute. By the time he finished his studies, Brown had abandoned painting and started drawing comics seriously.

Career

Brown specializes in personal and intimate works detailing moments in relationships. He writes and draws his comics in sketchbooks, and his drawing style mirrors the strain and awkwardness of the situations he depicts. His first self-published book, Clumsy (2002), appeared seemingly out of nowhere to grab attention from cartoonists and comics fans, alike. Brown wrote and drew Clumsy while at the School of the Art Institute.

Established as a sensitive chronicler of bittersweet young-adult romance and nonsensical superhero parody, Brown's current direction remains split between autobiographical material, examining the minutiae of everyday life, whatever humorous fiction he feels in the mood for, and a wide range of fiction subjects in his series Sulk. Brown has also created two series of books set in the Star Wars expanded universe (under the "Legends" & "Infinities" brands).

In 2012, Brown told USA Today that Mark Alan Stamaty's picture book Small in the Saddle influenced his own career and about subsequently meeting its author; Brown's girlfriend (and later his wife) had helped him find a copy.

Personal life
Brown lives in Chicago with his wife Jennifer, a former Marvel Comics business development executive, and their two sons.

Comic works

Brown's most popular works — Clumsy (2002; the story of a long-distance relationship), Unlikely (the story of how Brown lost his virginity), and AEIOU (Any Easy Intimacy (Over Us)) — comprise the so-called "Girlfriend Trilogy" and its epilogue, Every Girl is the End of the World For Me. More recently, his autobiographical work has included Little Things, and the memoirs Funny Misshapen Body and A Matter Of Life. His humorous works include Bighead (a super-hero parody), I Am Going To Be Small, Cat Getting Out Of A Bag, Kids Are Weird, and the graphic novel series Incredible Change-Bots.

His work has been featured in MOME Summer 2005, Vol. 1, as well as Drawn & Quarterly Showcase, McSweeney's #13, and The Best American Comics 2007. He was also featured in local newspapers such as the Chicago Reader and NewCity.

Brown's "To Phoenix I'm Sorry I Missed You" was published in the Spring 2008 issue of The Florida Review.

Brown has written and drawn seven books set in the Star Wars expanded universe. These include four humorous takes on Darth Vader as a hapless father to young Luke Skywalker and Princess Leia — Darth Vader and Son, Vader's Little Princess, Goodnight, Darth Vader, and Darth Vader and Friends — and three volumes in the Jedi Academy series, which are young-adult novels done in the mixed cartooning and diary style of the Diary of a Wimpy Kid series.

Critical and commercial reception

He won an Ignatz Award in 2003 in the category of Outstanding Mini-Comic, for I Am Going To Be Small.

James Kochalka has called Brown's Clumsy his "favorite graphic novel ever." Clumsy (2002) was originally self-published and was later published by Top Shelf Productions; as of 2007, an estimated 20,000 copies have been printed, according to an interview with Brown in The Comics Journal.

Brown won back-to-back Eisner Awards for Best Humor Publication, for Darth Vader And Son (2013) and Vader's Little Princess (2014).

Other work

Brown has contributed to NPR's This American Life (April 18, 2003).

Brown directed the animated music video for Death Cab for Cutie's "Your Heart is an Empty Room" (April 11, 2006).

He was featured in Bruce Parsons' documentary Drawing Between The Lines (2009).

He illustrated the movie poster for the feature-length documentary Rabbit Fever (2009).

He co-wrote the feature film, Save the Date (2012), with Egan Reich and Michael Mohan.  The film, directed by Mohan, stars Lizzy Caplan, Alison Brie, Martin Starr, Geoffrey Arend, and Mark Webber.

Bibliography

Books

Standalone books
 Clumsy (2002)
 Unlikely (2003)
 Bighead (2004)
 Miniature Sulk (2005)
 AEIOU or Any Easy Intimacy (2005)
 Every Girl Is The End Of The World For Me (2006) (included in Undeleted Scenes) 
 I Am Going To Be Small (2006)
 
 Incredible Change-Bots (2007)
 Little Things (2008)
 Sulk Vol. 1 — Bighead and Friends (2008)
 Sulk Vol. 2 — Deadly Awesome (2008)
 Funny Misshapen Body (2009)
 Sulk Vol. 3 — The Kind Of Strength That Comes From Madness (2009)
 
 
 Incredible Change-Bots Two (2011)
 A Matter Of Life (2012)
 Kids Are Weird (2014)
 Incredible Change-Bots Two-Point-Something-Something (2014)
 My Teacher is a Robot (2019) 
 Once Upon a Space-Time! (2020)
 A Total Waste of Space-Time! (2021)

Star Wars: Darth Vader and Son (series)
 Star Wars: Darth Vader and Son (2012) 
 Star Wars: Vader's Little Princess (2013)  
 Star Wars: Goodnight, Darth Vader (2014) 
 Star Wars: Darth Vader and Friends (2015) 
 Star Wars: Rey and Pals (2019) 
 Star Wars: A Vader Family Sithmas (2021)

Star Wars: Jedi Academy (series)
 Star Wars Jedi Academy (2013)
 Star Wars Jedi Academy: Return of the Padawan (2014)
 Star Wars Jedi Academy: The Phantom Bully (2015)

Lucy & Andy Neanderthal (series)
 Lucy & Andy Neanderthal (2016)
 Lucy & Andy Neanderthal: The Stone Cold Age (2017)
 Lucy & Andy Neanderthal: Bad to the Bones (2018)

Comics
 Be A Man (included in Undeleted Scenes)
 Conversations #2 (with James Kochalka)
 Feeble Attempts

Significant anthology contributions
 MOME Vol. 1-6
 Drawn & Quarterly Showcase Vol. 2
 Kramers Ergot Vol. 4
 The Escapist Vol. 3
 McSweeney's #13
 Best American Comics 2007
 Yale Anthology of Graphic Fiction Vol. 1-2
 POPGUN volume 4
 Bart Simpson's Treehouse of Horror #15
 Strange Tales #3
 Side B from Poseur Ink

References

External links

 
 Top Shelf Comix — Jeffrey Brown's publisher.
 The Holy Consumption of Chicago — Regularly updated with work by Jeffrey as well as John Hankiewicz, Paul Hornschemeier and Anders Nilsen.
 Crudely Drawn Naked People — A blog attempting to review all of Jeffrey Brown's published work. (On hiatus since September, 2008)
 ''Hand-written interview with Jeffrey Brown' — A 2-page interview from ifpthendirt.
 Audio Interview at Crown Commission April 2006 interview.
 Radio Interview with The Panel July 2006 interview.
 Drawing Between the Lines A short documentary created in 2006 about Jeffrey Brown and his work.
 Audio Interview February 2007 interview on the Around Comics Podcast
 Comic book artist Jeffrey Brown: More than meets the eye November 2007 interview with the New York Daily News.
 Comic artist Jeffrey Brown is back with Little Things April 2008 interview with the New York Daily News.
 
 Rumpus interview with Jeffrey Brown
http://www.topshelfcomix.com/creators.php?artist=14

Alternative cartoonists
Artists from Grand Rapids, Michigan
1975 births
Living people